Muslim Yar (born 10 May 1999) is a German cricketer who plays for the national team. Born in Afghanistan, he arrived in Germany as a refugee in 2016 during the "long summer of migration" from his home country.

In May 2019, he was named in Germany's Twenty20 International (T20I) squad for their three-match series against Belgium. The matches were the first T20Is to be played by the German cricket team. He made his T20I debut for Germany against Belgium on 11 May 2019. Later the same month, he was named in Germany's squad for the Regional Finals of the 2018–19 ICC T20 World Cup Europe Qualifier tournament in Guernsey. He played in Germany's opening match of the Regional Finals, against Guernsey, on 15 June 2019.

In September 2021, he was named in Germany's T20I squad for the Regional Final of the 2021 ICC Men's T20 World Cup Europe Qualifier tournament. In January 2022, he was named in Germany's team for the 2022 ICC Men's T20 World Cup Global Qualifier A tournament in Oman.

References

External links
 

1999 births
Living people
German cricketers
Germany Twenty20 International cricketers
Place of birth missing (living people)